1369 Ostanina is a dark and elongated asteroid of the Meliboea family, located in the outer region of the asteroid belt. It was discovered on 27 August 1935, by Soviet astronomer Pelageya Shajn at the Simeiz Observatory on the Crimean peninsula. It was named for the Russian village of Ostanin, birthplace of the discoverer.

Orbit and classification 

Ostanina orbits the Sun in the outer main-belt at a distance of 2.5–3.8 AU once every 5 years and 6 months (2,013 days; semi-major axis of 3.12 AU). Its orbit has an eccentricity of 0.21 and an inclination of 14° with respect to the ecliptic.

Based on the hierarchical clustering method (HCM) using the asteroid's proper orbital elements, Ostanina is a member of the Meliboea family, a smaller asteroid family of a few hundred carbonaceous outer-belt asteroids. The family was named after its lowest-numbered member, 137 Meliboea. In an alternative HCM-analysis, however, Ostanina is an asteroid of the main belt's background population.

Naming 

This minor planet was named after the small village of Ostanin, the birthplace of the discoverer, Pelageya Shajn. The village is located in Perm Krai, now part of the Russian Volga district. The official  was published by the Minor Planet Center in November 1952.

Physical characteristics 

In both the Tholen- and SMASS-like taxonomy of the Small Solar System Objects Spectroscopic Survey (S3OS2), Ostanina is a hydrated C-type asteroid (Caa and Ch), while in the SDSS-based taxonomy, the asteroid is a common C-type.

Rotation period 

In June 2011, a rotational lightcurve of Ostanina was obtained from photometric observations by French and Swiss astronomers Pierre Antonini, François Colas, Valery Lainey, Laurène Beauvalet and Raoul Behrend. Lightcurve analysis gave a rotation period of  hours with a very high brightness variation of 1.11 magnitude. A high brightness amplitude is indicative of a non-spheroidal, elongated shape. Other well defined rotation periods of 8.399 and 8.397 hours were obtained by Robert Stephens at the Center for Solar System Studies  in California in 2017, and by V. G. Shevchenko at the Kharkov Observatory  in 1996, respectively.

Additional period determinations: 6+ hours by Jean-Gabriel Bosch at the Collonges Observatory , 6.145 hours at the Catania and Pino Torinese observatories in 2000, 8.3945 hours by René Roy in 2016, 8.397 hours by V. G. Chiorny in 2003 and 2007, and 8.4 hours by Roberto Crippa and Federico Manzini at the Sozzago Astronomical Station  in 2010.

Diameter and albedo 

According to the surveys carried out by the Infrared Astronomical Satellite IRAS, the Japanese Akari satellite and the NEOWISE mission of NASA's Wide-field Infrared Survey Explorer, Ostanina measures between 40.6 and 43.6 kilometers in diameter and its surface has an albedo between 0.049 and 0.061. The Collaborative Asteroid Lightcurve Link adopts the results obtained by IRAS, that is, an albedo of 0.0545 and diameter of 41.24 kilometers using an absolute magnitude of 10.7.

Notes

References

External links 
 Lightcurve Database Query (LCDB), at www.minorplanet.info
 Dictionary of Minor Planet Names, Google books
 Asteroids and comets rotation curves, CdR – Geneva Observatory, Raoul Behrend
 Discovery Circumstances: Numbered Minor Planets (1)-(5000) – Minor Planet Center
 
 

001369
Discoveries by Pelageya Shajn
Named minor planets
19350827